TC1 may refer to:
 TC1 studio, a BBC studio at Television Centre, London
 Tc1 transposon, a transposon active in Caenorhabditis elegans, and the, all inactive, Tc1-like transposons in humans, of the Tc1/mariner class of transposons
 Minolta TC-1, a camera 
 Sky Sword I, a Taiwanese anti-aircraft missile also known as Tien Chien 1 or TC-1